Gamlestaden is an urban district in Gothenburg, Sweden. The district has 7273 inhabitants (2009). In and around Gamlestaden there are some industries. Most well-known is SKF.

External links
Föreningen Trygga Gamlestaden

Gallery

References 

Gothenburg